Javier Rodríguez may refer to:

Javier Rodríguez (artist) (born 1972), Spanish comics artist
Javier Rodríguez (sport shooter) (born 1964), Mexican sport shooter
Javier Rodríguez Nebreda (born 1974), Spanish futsal player
Javier Rodríguez Pérez (born 1979), Spanish basketball player, see 2007–08 ACB season
Javier Rodríguez Venta (born 1975), Spanish footballer
Javier Rodríguez a.k.a rodra, Spanish reporter born in Madriz
Javier Pascual Rodríguez (born 1971), former Spanish cyclist
José Javier Rodríguez Mayorga, Ecuadorian football manager of the Ecuador national under-17 football team
Javier Rodriguez, a character in Traffic (2000 film)

See also
Francisco Javier Rodríguez (born 1981), Mexican footballer
Francisco Javier Rodriguez (disambiguation)